Jofotek-Bromnya is a Papuan language of Sarmi Regency, Papua, Indonesia.

There are two dialects:

Bromnya dialect, spoken in Srum village, Bonggo subdistrict
Jofotek dialect, spoken in Biridua village, Pantai Timur subdistrict

Colonial records of Mander show it to be the same language.'''

References

Languages of western New Guinea
Orya–Tor languages